Results from the 1991 Monaco Grand Prix Formula Three held at Monte Carlo on May 11, 1991, in the Circuit de Monaco.

Classification 

Monaco Grand Prix Formula Three
Formula Three
Motorsport in Monaco